Melbourne Market, more formally the Melbourne Wholesale Fruit & Vegetable Markets, is the main wholesale produce market for Melbourne, Australia, and the wider state of Victoria. Located in the outer northern suburb of Epping and operated by the Melbourne Market Authority, the Market provides for the wholesale distribution of fruit, vegetables and flowers to the Melbourne region daily.

The markets were located on a 33-hectare site in Footscray Road, West Melbourne, adjacent to the Melbourne Fish Markets, the Port of Melbourne and the South Dynon railway yards and were moved to Epping in 2015. Prior to Footscray they were at the Queen Victoria Market and before that the Western Market in Collins Street which opened in 1841.

References

External links

 Melbourne Markets web site

Retail markets in Melbourne